In the geometry of curves, an orthoptic is the set of points for which two tangents of a given curve meet at a right angle.

Examples:
 The orthoptic of a parabola is its directrix (proof: see below),
 The orthoptic of an ellipse  is the director circle  (see below),
 The orthoptic of a hyperbola  is the director circle  (in case of  there are no orthogonal tangents, see below),
 The orthoptic of an astroid  is a quadrifolium with the polar equation  (see below). 

Generalizations:
 An isoptic is the set of points for which two tangents of a given curve meet at a fixed angle  (see below).
 An isoptic of two plane curves is the set of points for which two tangents meet at a fixed angle.

Orthoptic of a parabola 
Any parabola can be transformed  by a rigid motion (angles are not changed) into a parabola with equation . Replacing  gives the parametric representation of the parabola with the tangent slope as parameter:  The tangent has the equation  with the still unknown , which can be determined by inserting the coordinates of the parabola point. One gets 

If a tangent contains the point , off the parabola, then the equation

holds, which has two solutions  and  corresponding to the two tangents passing . The free term of a reduced quadratic equation is always the product of its solutions. Hence, if the tangents meet at  orthogonally, the following equations hold: 

The last equation is equivalent to

which is the equation of the directrix.

Orthoptic of an ellipse and hyperbola

Ellipse 

Let  be the ellipse of consideration. 

(1) The tangents to the ellipse  at the vertices and co-vertices intersect at the 4 points , which lie on the desired orthoptic curve (the circle ).

(2) The tangent at a point  of the ellipse  has the equation  (see tangent to an ellipse). If the point is not a vertex this equation can be solved for y: 

Using the abbreviations  and the equation  one gets:

Hence  and the equation of a non vertical tangent is

 (For another proof: see Ellipse.)

If a tangent contains the point , off the ellipse, then the equation

holds. Eliminating the square root leads to

which has two solutions  corresponding to the two tangents passing through . The constant term of a monic quadratic equation is always the product of its solutions. Hence, if the tangents meet at  orthogonally, the following equations hold: 

The last equation is equivalent to

From (1) and (2) one gets:
 The intersection points of orthogonal tangents are points of the circle  .

Hyperbola 
The ellipse case can be adopted nearly exactly to the hyperbola case. Therefore:
 The intersection points of orthogonal tangents are points of the circle , where .

Orthoptic of an astroid 

An astroid can be described by the parametric representation
.
From the condition

one recognizes the distance  in parameter space at which an orthogonal tangent to  appears. It turns out that the distance is independent of parameter , namely .

Their common point has coordinates:

This is simultaneously a parametric representation of the orthoptic.

Elimination of the parameter  yields the implicit representation 

Introducing the new parameter  one gets

(The proof uses the angle sum and difference identities.) Hence we get the polar representation
 
of the orthoptic. Hence:
 The orthoptic of an astroid is a quadrifolium.

Isoptic of a parabola, an ellipse and a hyperbola 

Below the isotopics for angles  are listed. They are called -isoptics. For the proofs see below.

Equations of the isoptics 
 Parabola:
The -isoptics of the parabola with equation  are the branches of the hyperbola

 Ellipse:
The -isoptics of the ellipse with equation  are the two parts of the degree-4 curve

(see picture).

 Hyperbola:
The -isoptics of the hyperbola with the equation  are the two parts of the degree-4 curve

Proofs 
 Parabola:
A parabola  can be parametrized by the slope of its tangents :

The tangent with slope  has the equation 

The point  is on the tangent if and only if

 

This means the slopes ,  of the two tangents containing  fulfil the quadratic equation 

must be fulfilled.

This is the equation of the hyperbola above.

 Ellipse:
In the case of an ellipse  one can adopt the idea for the orthoptic for the quadratic equation

Now, as in the case of a parabola, the quadratic equation has to be solved and the two solutions ,  must be inserted into the equation

Rearranging shows that the isoptics are parts of the degree-4 curve:

 Hyperbola:

To visualize the isoptics, see implicit curve.

External links 

Special Plane Curves.
 Mathworld
 Jan Wassenaar's Curves
 "Isoptic curve" at MathCurve
 "Orthoptic curve" at MathCurve

Notes

References
 

Curves